The 2007 Pepsi 400 was the 18th race of the 2007 NASCAR Nextel Cup Series season and held on July 7, 2007, at Daytona International Speedway in Daytona Beach, Florida.

It was the final race at Daytona named the Pepsi 400; beginning in 2008, the race was sponsored by Coca-Cola's Coke Zero brand as the Coke Zero 400.

Background

Qualifying
Boris Said was on the pole with 14 cars left to qualify until a rainstorm stopped qualifying.  Eventually, it was cancelled outright, sending home, among others, Said, Michael Waltrip, and Jeremy Mayfield who had each posted three of the six fastest attempts.

All times that were recorded were eliminated, and the starting lineup was set according to the NASCAR rule book.  The pole sitter was Jeff Gordon, and Denny Hamlin sat on the outside.  Ironically, this was the reverse of the previous week's finishing running order.

It was the first time in the speedway's history that a qualifying session was not completed, covering a total of 97 races. As a result of what happened, on January 21, 2008, NASCAR changed the rules that put those not in the Top 35 Owners' Points into a separate session in order to make the race, also called "The Boris Said Rule".

Starting lineup

Race
Jamie McMurray and Kyle Busch created one of the most memorable finishes, running side-by-side for nearly 32 laps. McMurray defeated Busch to win the Pepsi 400 and claim his second victory and end a 166-race winless streak that had spanned since 2002, when he won in only his second start while subbing for Sterling Marlin.  The final margin of victory was .005 seconds, tied for the second-closest margin in NASCAR history since electronic scoring and timing was adopted in 1993.  The other Top 5 finishers were Kurt Busch in third, Carl Edwards in fourth,  and Jeff Gordon in fifth.

As at the Daytona 500, some of the sport's biggest stars struggled. Kevin Harvick finished 34th while Dale Earnhardt Jr., Tony Stewart, and Denny Hamlin finished 36th, 38th, and 43rd respectively. Despite the fact there were many incidents throughout the race, most were relatively minor and the "Big One" never happened.

Race results

Notes
Kyle Busch missed, by the slimmest of margins, being the first driver to win a Busch Series and a Nextel Cup Series race on the same day.  That morning, he had won the Winn-Dixie 250, postponed from Friday night because of rain.
For the first time since 1965, no one from the Petty family was in the starting lineup for a race at Daytona.  Kyle Petty was instead a broadcaster for TNT, and John Andretti took his place in the starting lineup.
This was the last race which combined the older-design cars with restrictor plates.  The next such race, the 2007 UAW-Ford 500 at Talladega Superspeedway, used the Car of Tomorrow which then became standard in 2008.
Two days after this race, International Speedway Corporation, which owns DIS, signed a multi-year deal with Coca-Cola to sell beverages at all its tracks.   That meant that this race would be renamed the Coke Zero 400 as of 2008.
Clint Bowyer finished 7th in the #07 car, the date was 07/07/07.

References

External links
Complete race results 
Points standings 
Practice speeds 
Qualifying results 

Pepsi 400
Pepsi 400
NASCAR races at Daytona International Speedway
July 2007 sports events in the United States